Tom Bukovac is an American session musician and producer. He was born in Cleveland, Ohio, and raised in nearby Willowick, Ohio. He has been a Nashville-based musician since 1992. He previously owned 2nd Gear, a used music consignment shop in South Nashville.

Career
Bukovac began playing guitar at age eight, and performed his first shows at age thirteen at his widowed mother's bar, The Surfside Lounge, in Eastlake, Ohio. He moved to Nashville in 1992 to pursue a career as a guitarist.

Bukovac has played on over 500 albums, including projects by Steven Tyler, Stevie Nicks, Bob Seger, John Oates, Joan Osborne, Vince Gill, Dave Stewart, Joss Stone, Hank Williams Jr., Sheryl Crow, Don Henley, Carrie Underwood, Richard Marx, Rascal Flatts, Keith Urban, Willie Nelson, Martina McBride, Faith Hill, Kenny Loggins, Reba McEntire, Blake Shelton, LeAnn Rimes, Florida Georgia Line, Dallas Smith, Lionel Richie, among many others.

Bukovac has toured with Joe Walsh (2017 – Tom Petty and the Heartbreakers 40th Anniversary Tour); Vince Gill (2016); John Fogerty; Faith Hill; Trigger Hippy; Wynonna Judd; Tanya Tucker, and others.

Production credits 
In 2014, Bukovac produced Trigger Hippy's self-titled album, which was released by Rounder Records. Featured on this album alongside Bukovac are Joan Osborne, Jackie Greene, Steve Gorman (of Black Crowes) and Nick Govrik.

Personal life 
In 2010, Bukovac married songwriter/artist Sarah Buxton; they have two children. In 2020, during the COVID-19 pandemic, Bukovac started the YouTube video series, Homeskoolin; the videos were recorded with an iPhone in his garage.

Awards and nominationsMusic Row Magazine AwardsAcademy of Country Music Awards'

References 

1968 births
Living people
American country guitarists
American male guitarists
American session musicians
Guitarists from Ohio
Guitarists from Tennessee
Musicians from Cleveland
Musicians from Nashville, Tennessee
20th-century American guitarists
People from Willowick, Ohio
Country musicians from Tennessee
Country musicians from Ohio
20th-century American male musicians